Allan Marquand (December 10, 1853 – September 24, 1924) was an art historian at Princeton University and a curator of the Princeton University Art Museum.

Early life
Marquand was born on December 10, 1853 in New York City.  He was a son of Elizabeth Love (née Allen) Marquand (1826–1895) and Henry Gurdon Marquand, a prominent philanthropist and art collector who served as the second president of the Metropolitan Museum of Art.

After graduating from Princeton in 1874, Allan obtained his Ph.D. in Philosophy at the Johns Hopkins University in 1880. His thesis, supervised by Charles Sanders Peirce, was on the logic of Philodemus.

Career
After obtaining his Ph.D., he returned to Princeton in 1881 to teach Latin and logic.

During the 1881–1882 academic year, Marquand built a mechanical logical machine that is still extant; he was inspired by related efforts of William S. Jevons in the UK. In 1887, following a suggestion of Peirce's, he outlined a machine to do logic using electric circuits.  This necessitated his development of Marquand diagrams.

McCosh, the President of Princeton, deemed Marquand's relatively mathematical approach to teaching logic "unorthodox and uncalvinistic", an approach he had learned at Peirce's feet. Hence in 1883, Marquand was offered a position teaching art history, a position he held until his death and at which he excelled. He was elected chairman of the Department of Art and Archaeology in 1905. He also served as the first director of the Princeton University Art Museum, a position he held until his 1922 retirement.

Personal life
On June 18, 1896, he married Eleanor Cross in the Church of the Holy Communion in South Orange, New Jersey. Eleanor, a daughter of English born railroad official and banker Richard James Cross and Matilda (née Redmond) Cross, was a niece of Goold H. Redmond and Frances Redmond Livingston. Her brothers, John Walter and Eliot Buchanan Cross, were prominent architects.  Together, Eleanor and Allan were the parents of four children:

 Eleanor Marquand (1897–1988), who married George Howard Forsyth Jr., a Guggenheim Fellow, in 1927.  They divorced and in 1948 she married widower Douglas Delanoy, a member of the research staff of Merrill Lynch, Pierce, Fenner & Beane.
 Mary Marquand (1900–1974), who married industrialist Harold K. Hochschild, the president of the American Metal Company in 1941.
 Sarnia Marquand (1902–1984), who never married.
 Allan Marquand Jr. (1912–1938), who married Gertrude Palmer before his death at age 26 in 1938.

Marquand died at the Presbyterian Hospital in New York on September 24, 1924 and was buried at Princeton Cemetery.  His widow, an authority on the representation and symbolism of flowers and trees in art, died in February 1950.

Publications

See also 
 Logical machine

References

Further reading 
Ketner, Kenneth Lane, (assisted by A. F. Stewart) 1984, "The Early History of Computer Design: C. S. Peirce and Marquand's Logical Machines," Princeton University Library Chronicle: 187–211.
Marquand, Allan
 1883, in Charles Sanders Peirce, ed., Studies in Logic by members of the Johns Hopkins University, Little, Brown, and Company, Boston, MA, 1883. Reprinted 1983. John Benjamins.
 "The Logic of the Epicureans," pp. 1–11, Arisbe Eprint. Google Books Eprint.
 "A Machine for Producing Syllogistic Variations", pp. 12–15 Google Books Eprint.
 "Note on an Eight-Term Logical Machine", p. 16, Google Books Eprint.
 1886, "A New Logical Machine," Proceedings of the American Academy of Arts and Sciences 21: 303–307, Little, Brown, and Company, Boston, MA, 1886. Google Books Eprint.
Peirce, Charles Sanders, 1993, "Letter, Peirce to A. Marquand" dated 30 December 1886, in Kloesel, C. et al., eds., Writings of Charles S. Peirce: A Chronological Edition: Volume 5: 1884–1886. Indiana University Press: 421-422, with an image of the letter page with the circuits on p. 423.

External links

 Allan Marquand Papers at the Princeton University Library
 Marquand, Allan from Alexander Leitch, A Princeton Companion, copyright Princeton University Press (1978).

1853 births
1924 deaths
Princeton University alumni
Princeton University faculty
Johns Hopkins University alumni
American art historians
Charles Sanders Peirce
People from New York City
Burials at Princeton Cemetery
American art curators
Historians from New York (state)